Stadionul CFR is a multi-purpose stadium in Pașcani, Romania. It is currently used mostly for football matches and is the home ground of CSM Pașcani. The stadium holds 3,500 people.

External links
Stadionul CFR at soccerway.com

Football venues in Romania
Pașcani
Buildings and structures in Iași County